Chan Tan Lui (born 12 January 1969) is a Chinese-born Hong Kong table tennis player. From 1989 to 1996 she won several medals in singles, doubles, and team events in the Asian Table Tennis Championships and in the World Table Tennis Championships. She also competed at the 1992 Summer Olympics and the 1996 Summer Olympics.

References

1969 births
Living people
Hong Kong female table tennis players
Asian Games medalists in table tennis
Table tennis players at the 1990 Asian Games
Table tennis players at the 1994 Asian Games
Table tennis players at the 1998 Asian Games
Asian Games silver medalists for Hong Kong
Asian Games bronze medalists for Hong Kong
Medalists at the 1990 Asian Games
Medalists at the 1994 Asian Games
Medalists at the 1998 Asian Games
Table tennis players from Beijing
Olympic table tennis players of Hong Kong
Table tennis players at the 1992 Summer Olympics
Table tennis players at the 1996 Summer Olympics